The 1991 Plymouth City Council election took place on 2 May 1991 to elect members of Plymouth City Council in Devon, England. This was on the same day as other local elections. The Labour Party gained control of the council from the Conservative Party, who had held it since its creation in 1973.

Overall results

|-
| colspan=2 style="text-align: right; margin-right: 1em" | Total
| style="text-align: right;" | 60
| colspan=5 |
| style="text-align: right;" | 94,611
| style="text-align: right;" |

Ward results

Budshead (3 seats)

Compton (3 seats)

Drake (3 seats)

Efford (3 seats)

Eggbuckland (3 seats)

Estover (3 seats)

Ham (3 seats)

Honicknowle (3 seats)

Keyham (3 seats)

Mount Gould (3 seats)

Plympton Erle (3 seats)

Plympton St Mary (3 seats)

Plymstock Dunstone (3 seats)

Plymstock Radford (3 seats)

Southway (3 seats)

St Budeax (3 seats)

St Peter (3 seats)

Stoke (3 seats)

Sutton (3 seats)

Trelawny (3 seats)

References

1991 English local elections
May 1991 events in the United Kingdom
1991
1990s in Devon